Duncan McLaren (12 January 1800 – 26 April 1886) was a Scottish Liberal Party politician and political writer. He served as a member of the burgh council of Edinburgh, then as Lord Provost, then as a Member of Parliament (MP) for the Edinburgh constituency.

Life

Born in Renton, Dunbartonshire, Duncan McLaren was the youngest of ten children of John McLaren and Catherine McLellan. Apart from two years of schooling, he was self-taught. After school, he was apprenticed to a merchant in Dunbar. In 1824, he set up his own business as a draper in Edinburgh. He became a member of the town council in 1833. He became treasurer in 1837 and found that the royal burgh's finances were in ruin and that the Scottish capital was bankrupt. His work extricated Edinburgh from financial ruin. In 1835, he pioneered free education for all classes and started a building programme of thirteen schools.

He was elected Lord Provost of Edinburgh in 1851. McLaren was a Liberal and supported the anti–Corn Law campaign of John Bright, the opening of the Meadows to the public, and the establishment of the Industrial Museum (now the National Museum of Scotland). McLaren was also a governor of the Heriot Free School trust.

In 1865 he was elected one of Edinburgh's two Members of Parliament, a position he held until he retired 16 years later. At Westminster he proved a conscientious and intelligent representative, and acquired a position of so much authority on questions related to Scotland that he was called "Member for Scotland". He was then living in Newington House.

Duncan McLaren was married three times – the third being Priscilla Bright (sister of John Bright and Margaret Bright Lucas), whom he married in 1848, and they lived together in Newington House, Edinburgh, from 1852 until his death in 1886. He is buried (together with most of his family) in St Cuthbert's Churchyard in the heart of Edinburgh. His huge monument lies against the east wall of the first south extension to the graveyard, immediately below Edinburgh Castle.

Family
McLaren married three times.

Firstly, in 1829, he married Grant Aitken (1805–1833). Following her death he married Christina Gordon Renton (1813–1841). Finally, in 1848, he married Priscilla Bright (1815–1906), who outlived him by twenty years. All three wives are buried with him.

He was the father of John McLaren (son of his first wife), Agnes McLaren, Catherine McLaren (mother of F. S. Oliver) (with his second wife Christina Renton), and then Charles McLaren, Helen Priscilla McLaren and Walter Stowe Bright McLaren (with his third wife Priscilla Bright McLaren).

Artistic recognition

A full-length portrait of McLaren by George Reid RSA hangs in the Old Council Chamber (now called the Diamond Jubilee Room) within Edinburgh City Chambers.

Further reading
 Pickard, Willis (2011), The Member for Scotland: A Life of Duncan McLaren, John Donald,

References

Attribution

External links 
 
Correspondence of Priscilla McLaren
Duncan McLaren on ThePeerage.com
Edinburgh City Archives

1800 births
1886 deaths
People from Renton, West Dunbartonshire
Lord Provosts of Edinburgh
Members of the Parliament of the United Kingdom for Edinburgh constituencies
Scottish Liberal Party MPs
Scottish political writers
UK MPs 1865–1868
UK MPs 1868–1874
UK MPs 1874–1880
UK MPs 1880–1885
Duncan
19th-century Scottish businesspeople